David Earl "Swede" Savage Jr. (August 26, 1946 – July 2, 1973) was an American race car driver. He died at age 26 from complications while recovering from injuries suffered in a crash during the 1973 Indianapolis 500, nearly five weeks

Early life
Born and raised in San Bernardino, California, Savage was the eldest son of David Earl Savage Sr. and Joetta Taylor Savage. He began Soap Box Derby racing at the age of five, moved up to racing quarter midget cars, then at age twelve to Go-Kart racing. By his mid-teens he was racing motorcycles competitively.

An exceptional natural athlete, he was honored as an all-state high school football player at San Bernardino's Pacific High School as a junior, but was ruled ineligible for his senior year because he had accepted prize money racing motorcycles and was therefore ruled a professional athlete.

Racing career
In January 1967, Savage made a point of showing up at a Ford Motor Company test session at Riverside International Raceway attended by, among others, racing legend Dan Gurney. Also in attendance was a Ford public relations executive named Monte Roberts, who watched Savage calmly wheelie a motorcycle for the better part of a mile and, struck by Savage's "racy" name and obvious talent, encouraged Ford officials to take Savage under their wing. After a partial season driving NASCAR stock cars in the South for the Ford factory-backed racing team Holman-Moody, Savage received a telephone call from Gurney inviting him back to Southern California to try his hand at sports car racing.

Savage debuted in the old SCCA United States Road Racing Championship (USRRC) series in April 1968, driving a Lola T70 Mk III (the car campaigned by Gurney in the 1967 Can-Am racing series; a condition of employment Gurney imposed on the young driver was that he rebuild and prepare the car for competition with very little assistance from other AAR staff). He finished fifth at Riverside in his one appearance in the car. In 1968 and 1969, he also raced in NASCAR events. Competing in the 1969 Daytona 500, he crashed after a wheel fell off on lap 124. With AAR's racing program cut back due to budget troubles, Savage resumed semi-pro motorcycle racing in the Southern California area. In 1970, Savage and Gurney drove identical factory-sponsored Plymouth Barracudas in the Trans-Am Series. Early in the season, Chrysler cut back support for the AAR effort and Gurney stepped out of the car to let Savage drive the entire season.

Driving an Eagle-Ford IndyCar, Savage won the Bobby Ball Memorial, a 150-mile race at Phoenix International Raceway on November 21, 1970. This would be his sole professional auto racing victory. In March 1971, Savage entered the Questor Grand Prix at Ontario Motor Speedway, driving an Eagle-Plymouth Formula 5000 car. The throttle stuck wide open, and Savage suffered near-fatal head injuries in the ensuing crash. He returned to driving in August at the Trans-Am event at Watkins Glen.

He competed in the Indianapolis 500 twice; in his debut in 1972, he finished 32nd after dropping out on lap six with mechanical problems.

1973 Indianapolis 500 crash and subsequent death

In the 1973 Indianapolis 500, Savage was entered in an STP-sponsored Eagle-Offenhauser (number 40) prepared by master mechanic George Bignotti. He had been the fastest driver for much of practice. Later in the day, as the winds abated, Johnny Rutherford, Bobby Unser, and Mark Donohue each bettered Savage's time.

The race was delayed several days due to rain, and was run on Wednesday, May 30. Savage held the lead from laps 43–54, and then made his first pit stop. He rejoined in second place, closely behind Al Unser and just ahead of Bobby Unser. Savage emerged from his stop with 70 gallons (nearly ) of additional fuel and a new (cold) right rear tire.

In his autobiography, Bobby Unser wrote that when Savage exited the pits, he became alarmed at how hard Savage was pushing, and dropped back slightly in anticipation of an incident. However, due to Savage's reputation in the racing world as a highly skilled driver who did not take unnecessary chances, Unser's comments have been attributed to his resentment of Savage's rapid rise in the racing world as opposed to the "hard knocks" experiences of Unser's career.

On lap 58, just behind Al Unser (who was about to make a pit stop of his own), Savage, pushing hard in anticipation of a coming rainstorm, lost control as he exited turn four.  Savage's car twitched back and forth, then slid across to the inside of the track at nearly top speed, hitting the angled inside wall nearly head-on. The force of the impact, with the car carrying a full load of fuel, caused the car to explode in a massive -high plume 

Savage, still strapped in his seat in a large piece of the car, was thrown back across the circuit. He came to rest adjacent to the outer retaining wall, fully conscious and completely exposed while he lay in a pool of flaming methanol fuel.  Anchoring the event live for tape delay broadcast later in the day, ABC Sports broadcaster Jim McKay expressed disbelief upon seeing that Savage was actually moving in the post crash wreckage while he was engulfed in flames.

The exact cause of Savage's sudden turn across the race track and into the infield wall has not been settled.  Television footage seems to show the right half of his rear wing had come loose, which would instantly change the downforce on the wheels and could explain the sudden back and forth twitching of the car.  A second theory is provided by numerous drivers complaining over their radios about oil on the track, as pole sitter Rutherford had been given the black flag for dropping fluid, most likely oil. Among those complaining about oil on the track was Jerry Grant, in an interview with Dave Diles of ABC Sports while the wreckage from Savage's crash was cleaned off the track. Diles was later filmed wiping oil off the front of Joe Leonard's car to prove the point, though Bobby Unser (who did not get along well with Savage and often ridiculed the driving ability of the younger driver) disputed that the drivers were running on an unsafe racetrack.

Savage joked with medical personnel after the wreck, and was expected to live when taken to Methodist Hospital and for some time thereafter. However, he died in the hospital 33 days after the 

The true cause of his death remains a point of dispute. It had been widely reported that Savage's death was caused by lung and kidney complications, but Steve Olvey, Savage's attending physician at Indy (and later CART's director of medical affairs), claimed in his book Rapid Response that the real cause of death was complications related to contaminated plasma. Olvey claimed that Savage contracted hepatitis B from a transfusion, causing his liver to fail. However, according to Savage's father, the percentage of oxygen they were giving Swede just prior to his death, due to the damage to his lungs from the fumes inhaled from the accident, was such that there was no way he could have survived, even if he had not contracted hepatitis B. Lung failure was repeated as the cause of death by Savage's daughter Angela in a May 2015 interview.

Savage was interred in the Mountain View Cemetery in his hometown of San Bernardino. He was married with a seven-year-old daughter, Shelly; his widow Sheryl was expecting their second child, daughter Angela, at the time of his death. Savage also had a son, John, who lives in Highland, California.

Complete USAC Championship Car results

Indy 500 results

Complete Non-Championship Formula One results
(key)

See also
List of fatalities at Indianapolis

References

External links
Swede Savage Official Tribute Site

1946 births
1973 deaths
American motorcycle racers
NASCAR drivers
Indianapolis 500 drivers
Trans-Am Series drivers
Sportspeople from San Bernardino, California
Sports deaths in Indiana
Racing drivers from California